Machine Men may refer to:

 Machine Men (toy), also known as Machine Robo
 Machine Men (band), a Finnish heavy metal band 1998–2011
 Machine Man, a fictional android superhero appearing in Marvel Comics
 Machine Man (novel), a 2011 novel written by Max Barry
 Machineman, a character in the Japanese television show Nebula Mask Machineman

See also
 Man-Machine (disambiguation)